Montrose Presbyterian Church is a historic church on County Road 20 in Montrose, Mississippi.

It was built circa 1910 and added to the National Register in 2003.

Mississippi historian Cyril Edward Cain is buried in Montrose Presbyterian Church Cemetery.

References

Presbyterian churches in Mississippi
Churches on the National Register of Historic Places in Mississippi
Carpenter Gothic church buildings in Mississippi
Churches completed in 1910
20th-century Presbyterian church buildings in the United States
National Register of Historic Places in Jasper County, Mississippi